Maureen Wright (born 20 October 1939) is an Australian athlete. She competed in the women's javelin throw at the 1956 Summer Olympics.

References

1939 births
Living people
Athletes (track and field) at the 1956 Summer Olympics
Australian female javelin throwers
Olympic athletes of Australia
Place of birth missing (living people)